"Keep On Dreaming" is a song recorded by Canadian country music group Prairie Oyster. It was released in 1999 as the second single from their sixth studio album, What Is This Country?. It peaked at number 9 on the RPM Country Tracks chart in April 1999.

Chart performance

Year-end charts

References

1998 songs
1999 singles
Prairie Oyster songs
Songs written by Joan Besen
ViK. Recordings singles